Lophostachys floribunda (syn. Lepidagathis floribunda (Pohl) C.Kameyama) is a plant native to the Caatinga and Cerrado vegetation of Brazil. This plant is cited in Flora Brasiliensis by Carl Friedrich Philipp von Martius.

External links
  Flora Brasiliensis: Lophostachys floribunda

floribunda
Endemic flora of Brazil
Flora of the Cerrado